The Sofo Line Interchange is a flyover under construction in Kumasi, Ghana.

References

Road interchanges in Ghana
Roads in Ghana